Anne of Bohemia may refer to:

 Anne of Bohemia (1204–1265), Duchess consort of Silesia
 Anne of Bohemia (1290–1313), eldest surviving daughter of Venceslaus II of Bohemia, first wife of Henry of Carinthia, 1306–1310 king of Bohemia
 Anne of Bohemia, Duchess of Austria (1323–1338), daughter of John of Bohemia, second wife of Otto, Duke of Austria
 Anne of Bohemia (1366–1394), a daughter of Charles IV, Holy Roman Emperor, first wife of Richard II of England
 Anne, Duchess of Luxembourg (1432–1462), daughter of Elisabeth II of Bohemia, wife of William III, Duke of Luxembourg
 Anna of Bohemia and Hungary (1503–1547), the only daughter of Vladislaus II of Bohemia and Hungary
 Anna of Austria (1528–1590), daughter of Anna of Bohemia and Hungary, wife of Albert V, Duke of Bavaria
 Anna of Austria (1549–1580), daughter of Maximilian II, Holy Roman Emperor, fourth wife of Philip II of Spain
 Anna of Tyrol, also known as Anna of Austria, Empress Matthias (1585–1618), daughter of Ferdinand II, Archduke of Further Austria, wife of Matthias, Holy Roman Emperor, king of Bohemia